Ekin Mert Daymaz  (born 2 December 1990) is a Turkish actor and model.

Life 
Daymaz was born in Arnhem, the Netherlands, to a family who were originally from Sivas. He later became a contestant on Best Model of Turkey and ranked 3rd. As of 2018, he has appeared in five different series. His debut series, Not Defteri (2014), came to an end due to low ratings. The next summer, he portrayed the character of Volkan Mazharoğlu  on Çilek Kokusu. It was followed by his role on FOX's series Hayat Sevince Güzel, in which he appeared in a leading role. The series was the most-viewed program in Turkey between 11 July - 15 August 2016.

Daymaz  studies coaching and fitness at Haliç University.

Filmography

References 

Turkish male television actors
1990 births
Turkish male models
Living people